Nakodok is a small town near the border between Kenya and South Sudan.

Transport
It lies on the route of a transport corridor for road, rail and oil connecting Lamu Port on the Indian Ocean and South Sudan.

References

Populated places in South Sudan